Eastmain ( meaning "Lands east of James Bay") is a Cree First Nation of Canada. Its members primarily live in the Terres réservées aux Cris or Cree reserved land (Indian reserve) of Eastmain, Quebec. It is governed by a band council and is a member of the Tribal Council of the Grand Council of the Crees.

Location
The reserve is located on the southern shore at the mouth of the Eastmain River as it empties into the eastern shore of James Bay. Adjacent to the reserved land is the village cri or Cree village of the same name. A Cree village is set aside for the use of the Nation, but members do not permanently residing there. The community is one of nine Cree First Nations that make up Eeyou Istchee, an equivalent territory which is an enclave within the Jamésie territory of Nord-du-Québec (Northern Quebec). The community is accessible by road;  to the James Bay Road which connects to the cities of the south. The community's airport, Eastmain River Airport, has regular service by Air Creebec to Montreal and other Cree and northern communities.

History
Ancestors of today's First Nations occupied the region around James Bay for more than 7000 years with artifacts dated to 3000–3500 years ago. Nomad hunters followed game as the last glaciers melted. Eventually, the groups  later permanently establishing themselves in what is known as Eeyou Istchee (the Cree traditional territory in eastern James Bay).

Henry Hudson, during his exploration of the bay with his name, first made contact with the Crees of James Bay in 1610. After spending the winter of 1668–1669, explorers Pierre-Esprit Radisson and Médard des Groseilliers convinced the English Crown, primarily Prince Rupert of the Rhine that a colonial enterprise in the bay would yield wealth in minerals and fur. This led to the creation of the Hudson Bay Company. As a result, the trading outposts were established in the region and the fur trade boomed.

Eastmain got its name in 1730 by the local Hudson Bay trading post that had become the company's trading headquarters for the east coast of James Bay and Hudson Bay. The town was known as East Main House and was originally located on the north shore of the Eastmain River, but in 1762, Eastmain was relocated to the south shore because it provided easier access to the town from the James Bay. Cree people began to settle in the area and the community of Eastmain was established in the early 18th century, however, the territory was reserved for the use of the Crees only in 1962.

Population

, Eastmain had a total registered population of 917 members with 806 living on the reserve. During Statistics Canada's 2016 Census, the reserve had 866 residents up from 767 in 2011, a 12.9% increase.

Languages
The Cree people speaks the Cree language. According to the 2016 Census, 87.3% of the members of the Eastmain First Nation have an indigenous language as first language. 92.5% speak an indigenous language at home and 94.2% know an indigenous language. For official languages, 76.9% know only English, 0% know only French, 17.9% know both, while 5.2% don't speak either official language.

References

Notes

Citations

External links
 Official website
 

First Nations governments in Quebec
Cree governments